Francisca Zubiaga y Bernales (1803–1835) was the first lady of Peru in 1829–1833 by her marriage to president Agustín Gamarra. She was also known as "La Mariscala" (The Field Marshal) and "Doña Pancha".

She became known for her courage after having accompanied her spouse on two expeditions to Upper Peru in 1828. She hosted salons after pattern from Europe. In 1831, during the visit of her spouse to Bolivia, she faced and prevented the attempted coup by vice president La Fuente. When she was about to crown Simón Bolívar, he put the crown on her. She died of tuberculosis. She was a controversial person, was under mobbing for false accusations of infidelity, described as a bold rider and an excellent shot. In Euskera, the Baske language: 'Zubiaga' means: 'Close to the bridge', it may stand for the publicans who charged the rate for crossing a bridge, there is an Italian town with a cognate name: Subiaco, Lazio.

References

 R. Adams, Jerome: Notable Latin American Women: Twenty-nine Leaders, Rebels, Poets, Battlers and spies, 1500-1900 MacFarland (1995)

1803 births
1835 deaths
First Ladies of Peru
19th-century Peruvian people
Peruvian expatriates in Chile
Peruvian salon-holders